Ongojou is a village in the commune of Dembéni on Mayotte. It is known for its rich history of wine making.

Populated places in Mayotte